Postcards from the Shell House is the third studio album by Australian blues and roots band Busby Marou. The album was released on 17 February 2017 and debuted at number 1 on the ARIA albums chart becoming the band's first number-one album.

Just prior to the album's release Busby Marou said "With this album for us, it's kind of make or break; we've spent so much time and money [on it], we've thrown everything into this one. We needed it to be successful; as much as we love it, it's also our livelihood."

Reception
Hamish Geale from The Examiner called the album "some of their best work to date, on what is a consistent if not systematic collection of songs." adding "The pair have cemented their own sound; showcasing elegant vocal harmonies atop upbeat acoustic guitar work."

Track listing

Charts

Weekly charts

Year-end charts

Release history

See also
 List of number-one albums of 2017 (Australia)

References

2017 albums
Busby Marou albums